Shenbagamae Shenbagamae is a 1988 Tamil language film written and directed by Gangai Amaran. The film stars Ramarajan and Rekha, with Silk Smitha, Vagai Chandrasekar, K. Shanmugasundaram, R. P. Vishwam, Senthil, S.S.Chandran and Vennira Aadai Moorthy. The title of the film is inspired from a song "Shenbagamae Shenbagamae" from the film Enga Ooru Pattukaran (1987), another combo of Ilaiyaraaja, Gangai Amaran and Ramarajan. This film ran for 100 days.

Plot

Cast 
 Ramarajan as Thangarasu
 Rekha as Shenbagam
 Silk Smitha
 Vagai Chandrasekhar as Muthaiah
 Shanmugasundaram as Surulivelu
 R. P. Viswam as Sivanandi
 Senthil
 S. S. Chandran
 Vennira Aadai Moorthy
A. Veerappan
Kallapetti Singaram
 Pakiri Samy
 Varalakshmi
S. N. Parvathy
 Sathya

Soundtrack 
The songs of the film were composed by Ilaiyaraaja. The song "Manja Podi" is a slower version of the song "Mata Rani Mounamidi" from Maharshi (1987).

Reception
The Indian Express wrote that Gangai Amaran "has paced the film well and the drama keeps building up".

References

External links 
 

1980s romance films
1980s Tamil-language films
Films directed by Gangai Amaran
Films scored by Ilaiyaraaja
Indian romance films